Domatowo  is a village in the administrative district of Gmina Puck, within Puck County, Pomeranian Voivodeship, Kashubia in northern Poland. It is located within the historic region of Pomerania.

The village has a population of 700.

Domatowo was a private church village within the Polish Crown, administratively located in the Puck County in the Pomeranian Voivodeship, owned by the monastery in Oliwa.

During the German occupation of Poland (World War II), the Germans murdered seven Poles in Domatowo in October 1939. Polish farmers from Domatowo were imprisoned in nearby Puck, and on November 3, 1939 murdered in the Piasnica massacre.

References

Domatowo